Songs is an album by soprano saxophonist Steve Lacy and poet Brion Gysin, which was recorded in Paris in 1981 and first released on the hat ART label as a double LP. The album was rereleased on CD in 1990 with an additional track.

Reception

All About Jazz said "Lacy and Gysin had worked together as far back as '69, and their rapport is evident here".

Track listing
All compositions by Steve Lacy except where noted
 "Gay Paree Bop" – 9:25
 "Nowhere Street" – 11:45
 "Somebody Special" – 9:15
 "Luvzya" (Oliver Johnson) – 7:00
 "Keep the Chance" – 7:00
 "Permutations: Junk Is No Good Baby" – 1:45
 "Permutations: Kick That Habit Man" – 0:45
 "Permutations: I Don't Work You Dig" – 1:40
 "Blue Baboon" – 4:55
 "Nowhere Street 1" [Incomplete] – 9:18 Additional track on CD reissue

Personnel
Steve Lacy – soprano saxophone, voice
Brion Gysin – lyrics, voice (tracks 4 & 6-8)
Steve Potts – alto saxophone, soprano saxophone
Bobby Few – piano
Irene Aebi – violin, voice 
Jean-Jacques Avenel – bass 
Oliver Johnson – drums

References

Steve Lacy (saxophonist) albums
1981 albums
Hathut Records albums
Collaborative albums